Aana Mayil Ottakam is a 2015 Indian Malayalam anthology film narrating three short, unconnected stories written and directed by Jayakrishnan and Anil Sign. Balu Varghese, Mithun Murali and Sharran are seen in prominent roles. Photography was completed in July 2015, and the film was released on 27 November 2015 in theatres in Kerala as well as online through Reelmonk simultaneously.

Plot
There are three movies in Aana Mayil Ottakam. The first one Aa Aaa E Ee stars Mithun Murali and is directed by Jayakrishnan. It depicts the journey of a schoolboy from a poor family in 1980 and ends in 2015 showing his life progress. The second one, 12 out of 15, directed by Jayakrishna and Anil Sign jointly is about life in a multi-national company. The plot develops in two rooms and Balu Varghese is the main lead. The third one, Fill In The Blanks, with Sharran in the lead, is directed by Anil Sign. The three movies are independent of each other.

Cast

Aa Aaa E Ee
Mithun Murali
Netra (Sushma Prakash) 
Chembil Ashokan
Sunil Sukhada
Seema G Nair
Gourav Menon
Meenakshi
Siddarth
Aakash Santhosh
 Hochimin K C

12/15
Balu Varghese
Santhosh Keezhattoor
Reina Maria
Sivanare

Fill in the blanks
Sharran as Gireesh
Gopalakrishnan
 Shivan
 Rajeev Rajan
 Reena
Divya
Remya
Indrans as Sajan
KTS Padannayil
Kalabhavan Haneef
Gopan
Vishnu Unnikrishnan
Vinod Kedamangalam
Sajad Bright

Release
The film released in theatres on 27 November 2015. Following the release of Ottaal simultaneously in theatres and online, Aana Mayil Ottakam released through Reelmonk.com the same day as its theatre release. The film was available for pre-booking before the online release, which was a first for Malayalam Cinema.

Soundtrack
The soundtrack of the film was launched was on 12 November 2015 through Muzik 247 by Arjun Lal.

References

External links 
 

Indian anthology films
2010s Malayalam-language films